Lambayeque originates from "Llampayec", an idol that was worshipped in northern Peru, and can refer to:

 Lambayeque, Peru, a city
 Lambayeque District
 Lambayeque Province
 Lambayeque Region
 Lambayeque or Sican culture